Home Credit is an international non-bank, consumer finance group founded in 1997 in the Czech Republic.

Home credit may also refer to:

 Home Credit & Finance Bank, a Russia's subsidiary of Home Credit Group B.V.
 Home equity line of credit, a type of loan in which the borrower uses a home as collateral
 Home Credit Bank, a bank in Kazakhstan, a Kazakhstan's subsidiary of Home Credit Group B.V.
 Home Credit Bank, a bank in Belarus, a subsidiary of Home Credit Group B.V. Which was sold to Alfa Bank Group
 Home credit, an alternative financial service in the UK.
 Home Credit Arena